Koanophyllon droserolepis, the Monte Torrecilla thoroughwort, is a species of flowering plant in the family Asteraceae. It is found only in Puerto Rico.

References

droserolepis
Endemic flora of Puerto Rico
Plants described in 1918
Flora without expected TNC conservation status